

International competitions

Men's national teams

Senior
20 – 30 July: 1980 Olympic Tournament at Moscow, Soviet Union
  
  
  
18 – 25 March: 1980 FIBA Americas Championship at San Juan, Puerto Rico
  
  
  
22 – 28 March: FIBA Africa Championship 1980 at Rabat, Morocco

Youth
22 – 30 August: 1980 FIBA Europe Under-18 Championship at Celje, Yugoslavia

Women's national teams

Senior
20 – 30 July: 1980 Olympic Tournament at Moscow, Soviet Union
  
  
  
13 – 21 September: 1980 FIBA Asia Championship at Hong Kong
  
  
  
19 – 28 September: 1980 EuroBasket at Yugoslavia

Youth
6 – 14 March: 1980 FIBA Europe Under-16 Championship at Hungary

Club competitions

Continental championships
Men

Women

Domestic championships

Naismith Memorial Basketball Hall of Fame inductions
Lester Harrison, contributor
Jerry Lucas, player
Oscar Robertson, player
Everett Shelton, coach
Dallas Shirley, referee
Jerry West, player

Births
February 28 — Tayshaun Prince
March 13 — Caron Butler
March 15 — Yannick Gagneur
March 16 — Felipe Reyes
April 15 — Raül López
April 23 — Rohanee Cox
April 30 — Luis Scola
May 30 — Ilona Korstin
June 7 — Berni Rodríguez
June 9 — Udonis Haslem
June 13 — Juan Carlos Navarro
June 14 — Elena Karpova
June 21 — Richard Jefferson
June 21 — Federico Kammerichs
July 6 — Pau Gasol
July 9 — Svetlana Abrosimova
August 1 — Asjha Jones
September 12 — Yao Ming
October 16 — Sue Bird
December 16 — Natalie Porter
December 17 — Suzy Batkovic

Deaths
February 5 — Skinny Johnson, American Hall of Fame college (Kansas) and AAU player (born 1911)
February 29 — Doug Kistler, American NBA player (born 1938)
April 22 — Decio Scuri, Italian Olympic coach and FIBA executive (born March 18)
May 5 — Stewart Way, American NCAA coach (born 1911)
May 23 — Terry Furlow, American NBA player (born 1954)
June 12 — Johnny Horan, American NBA and EPBL player (born 1916)
August 19 — Sadi Gülçelik, Turkish club and Olympic player (born 1930)
October 4 — Sihugo Green, American NBA player (born 1933)
October 27 — Art Hillhouse, American NBA player (born 1916)
November 14 — Johnny Horan, American NBA player (born 1932)
November 25 — Joe Cipriano, American college coach (Idaho, Nebraska) (born 1931)
November 27 — Ferenc Hepp, Hungarian FIBA executive (born 1909)
November 30 — Mieko Fukui, Japanese Olympic player (born 1956)
December 5 — Eddie Hickey, Hall of Fame American college coach (Creighton, Saint Louis, Marquette) (born 1902)
December 19 — Tarzan Cooper, American Hall of Fame player (New York Renaissance) (born 1907)

See also 

 1980 in sports

References